Roseann Bentley (born April 22, 1936) is an American politician who served in the Missouri Senate from the 30th district from 1995 to 2003. She was elected to the Greene County Commission in 2004, where she served for 12 years.

References

1936 births
20th-century American politicians
21st-century American politicians
20th-century American women politicians
21st-century American women politicians
Living people
Republican Party Missouri state senators
People from Springfield, Missouri
Women state legislators in Missouri